Assisi is a town and commune in Italy. 

Assisi may also refer to:

 Assisi Convent School (disambiguation)
 Assisi Catholic College, on the Gold Coast in Upper Coomera, Queensland, Australia
 Assisi Hospice, Singapore
 Assisi Animal Sanctuary, Conlig, County Down, Northern Ireland
 Assisi embroidery, a form of counted-thread embroidery
 Assisi (meteorite), which fell to earth in 1886 at Umbria, Italy
 Sergio Assisi (born 1972), Italian actor

See also
 Rufinus of Assisi, Italian saint and first bishop of Assisi
 Francis of Assisi (1181/82–1226), Italian Catholic saint, friar, deacon and preacher
 Giles of Assisi (c. 1190–1262), one of the original companions of Francis of Assisi
 Clare of Assisi (1194–1253), Italian saint and founder of the Order of Poor Ladies, one of the first followers of Francis of Assisi
 Agnes of Assisi (1197/1198–1253), Italian saint and abbess, younger sister of Clare of Assisi
 Amata of Assisi (died 1250), Italian nun, niece of Clare of Assisi
 Vitalis of Assisi (1295–1370), Italian saint, hermit and monk